Mega Man III is an action-platform video game by Capcom for the Nintendo Game Boy. It is the third game in the handheld version of the Mega Man series. The game follows the title character Mega Man as he fights the evil Dr. Wily, whose latest attempt to conquer the world involves sucking energy from the Earth's core to power a new machine. Along with foes from his past, Mega Man must contend with the next robot in Wily's line of "Mega Man Killers", Punk. Like its two consecutive predecessors on the Game Boy, the game combines elements from two previously released Nintendo Entertainment System (NES) titles: Mega Man 3 and Mega Man 4. In 2013, Mega Man III was made available on the Virtual Console of Japan's Nintendo eShop for the Nintendo 3DS. It was later released in the North American and PAL region eShops the following year.

Plot
The story of Mega Man III consists of the hero Mega Man battling the evil scientist Dr. Wily, who is using a converted oil platform in the middle of the ocean to draw energy from the Earth's core to power a new machine. After annihilating eight robots whom Wily had previously used, Mega Man makes his way to Wily's lab, where he encounters the mad doctor attempting to escape. A powerful robot designed specifically to destroy the hero, Punk, confronts Mega Man but is defeated. Mega Man chases Wily onto the oil platform (which emerges from the water as Wily's latest fortress) and halts his enemy's plans once again.

Gameplay

Mega Man III shares the action and platform gameplay set forth the NES Mega Man games. The player is able to choose between 4 stages that are immediately available. Mega Man's primary method of attack is his "Mega Buster", which can fire an unlimited number of small shots or can be charged by holding the down the button and then releasing a larger and more powerful blast. Beating the Robot Master boss at the end of each stage allows the player to add its unique weapon to Mega Man's arsenal.

The player can also gain access to Mega Man's dog  Rush, who can transform into a "Coil" mode to let the player jump higher or a "Jet" mode for flying large distances across the screen. Another companion robot, Flip Top Eddie, will appear in certain stages to randomly lend the player health, weapon power, extra lives, or storable Energy Tanks for completely refilling health. Mega Man III features four Robot Master adversaries from Mega Man 3 (Snake Man, Shadow Man, Spark Man, and Gemini Man) and four from Mega Man 4 (Dive Man, Drill Man, Skull Man, and Dust Man).

Development
Series contributor Keiji Inafune stated Capcom outsourced the development of Mega Man III (known in Japan as Rockman World 3) and the rest of the Game Boy titles to the same company that worked on Mega Man: Dr. Wily's Revenge due to a bad experience with the one that worked on Mega Man II. "I decided to look at World 3 as a fresh new start, and I remember digging into it with renewed zest," Inafune claimed. "Punk, in particular, was a favorite of mine and I used my sway as the producer to have him included in Mega Man Battle Network."

Reception and legacy

Mega Man III was given a positive review from the North American Electronic Gaming Monthly, which noted its use of familiar gameplay and a large amount of visual detail. In contrast, the United Kingdom's Nintendo Magazine System called it "a prime example of flogging a dead horse. Not really bad, but made unplayable by the sheer frustration level."

The editors of GameSpot consider Mega Man III a rare find because it was never re-released in budget form likes the two games before it. Mega Man III was made available on March 13, 2001, for the Nintendo Power cartridge service in Japan alongside the other four Game Boy Mega Man games. All five games were to receive an enhanced remake compilation on the Game Boy Advance in 2004, but the project was ultimately cancelled. A redesign of Punk was featured in the spin-off game Mega Man Battle Network 3. A stage featuring the boss Punk was part of the downloadable content for Mega Man 10 in 2010. On July 18, 2013, it was confirmed that Mega Man III is planned for release on the 3DS Virtual Console, which came out on October 9, 2013, in Japan, in North America on May 8, 2014, and in the PAL region on August 14, 2014.

References

External links

Official Rockman website 

1992 video games
Game Boy games
Platform games
Action video games
Mega Man games
Eco-terrorism in fiction
Side-scrolling video games
Video games developed in Japan
Virtual Console games
Superhero video games
Mega Man spin-off games
Virtual Console games for Nintendo 3DS